The 2016–17 Pepperdine Waves men's basketball team represented Pepperdine University during the 2016–17 NCAA Division I men's basketball season. This was head coach Marty Wilson's sixth full season at Pepperdine. The Waves played their home games at the Firestone Fieldhouse in Malibu, California as members of the West Coast Conference. They finished the season 9–22, 5–13 in WCC play to finish in eighth place. They lost in the first round of the WCC tournament to Pacific.

Previous season
The Waves finished the 2015–16 season 18–14, 10–8 in WCC play to finish in fourth place. They defeated San Francisco in the WCC tournament to advance to the semifinals where they lost to Saint Mary's. The received an invitation to the College Basketball Invitational tournament where they lost in the first round to Eastern Washington.

Departures

Incoming transfers

Recruiting Class of 2016

Roster

Schedule and results

|-
!colspan=9 style=| Non conference regular season

|-
!colspan=9 style=| WCC regular season

|-
!colspan=9 style=| WCC tournament

References

Pepperdine Waves men's basketball seasons
Pepperdine
Pepperdine
Pepperdine